The St Kilda wren (Troglodytes troglodytes hirtensis) is a small passerine bird in the wren family.

Description
The St Kilda wren is distinguished from the mainland form by its larger size and heavier barring, as well as its generally greyer and less rufous colouration.  It differs from other Scottish island sub-species by its heavy barring, long and strong bill, and its greyer and paler plumage. The voice is somewhat louder than the mainland subspecies.

Distribution and habitat
This wren is known only from St Kilda in the Outer Hebrides, where it is present on all islands in the group. In the breeding season it is largely found on the cliffs and steep rocky slopes with thick vegetation, but also around old buildings. Outside the breeding season it is more widely dispersed around the islands.

Ecology
The St Kilda wren feeds on small invertebrates such as beetles and their larvae, flies, moth larvae, spiders, centipedes and sandhoppers. Most birds breed in crevices and holes on cliffs concealed behind grasses and dead thrift. Some choose old walls and buildings, or the steep grassy slopes where puffins breed. The nest is built by the male and is rather bulky and is composed of dead grasses, mosses and bits of dead bracken, lined with white feathers moulted by seabirds. There are usually four to six eggs, white with reddish-brown speckles, mostly on the wide end.

Status
The St Kilda wren is a fairly common breeding resident on St Kilda.  The population was estimated at about 230 breeding pairs in 2002.

References

Endemic fauna of Scotland
Fauna of St Kilda, Scotland
Troglodytes (bird)
Birds described in 1884
1884 in Scotland
Taxa named by Henry Seebohm
Endemic biota of the Scottish islands